Arnoldsburg (also Arnoldsburgh) is an unincorporated community in Calhoun County, West Virginia, United States.  It lies along U.S. Route 33 at the point where West Virginia Route 16 heads southward; it is several miles south of the county seat of Grantsville.   Its elevation is 738 feet (225 m).  The West Fork Little Kanawha River flows through the community.  It has a post office with the ZIP code 25234.

Arnoldsburg derives its name from Charles Arnold, a local schoolteacher.

References

Unincorporated communities in Calhoun County, West Virginia
Unincorporated communities in West Virginia
Former county seats in West Virginia